Ashok Amritraj (born 22 February 1956) is Chairman and CEO of the Hyde Park Entertainment Group and was formerly CEO of National Geographic Films.

Career 
Amritraj has produced over 100 films during his 35-year career with collective worldwide revenues in excess of US$2 billion. He partnered with every major studio in Hollywood and produced films starring the likes of Dwayne "The Rock" Johnson, Robert De Niro, Bruce Willis, Sandra Bullock, Sylvester Stallone, Angelina Jolie, Cate Blanchett, Dustin Hoffman, Andrew Garfield, Steve Martin, Rajinikanth, Antonio Banderas, Jennifer Aniston, Nicolas Cage, and many more.

In 2016, Amritraj was appointed as the first United Nations India Goodwill Ambassador for the 17 UN Sustainable Development Goals. In December 2018, by decree of the President of the Republic of France, Amritraj was appointed a Chevalier (knight) of the Ordre National du Merité.

Amritraj had box office hits such as Ghost Rider: Spirit of Vengeance, starring Nicolas Cage, Bringing Down the House, starring Steve Martin, Premonition, starring Sandra Bullock, Walking Tall starring The Rock. His filmography also comprises critically acclaimed titles including 99 Homes starring Andrew Garfield and Michael Shannon, Blue Valentine starring Ryan Gosling and Michelle Williams, and Shopgirl, starring Steve Martin and Claire Danes.

Amritraj's current projects include: Tennis player Arthur Ashe's Biopic in Partnership with Warner Music Group, The Man Who Lived Underground, in partnership with Kenya Barris’ Khalabo Ink Society and Paramount Pictures, Pashmina, a Major Animated Musical in partnership with Netflix, to be directed by Gurinder Chadha, Amnesty, to be written & directed by Ramin Bahrani, Rubik's Cube, based on the worldwide best selling toy, in partnership with Endeavor Content, Remote Control starring Gerard Butler in Partnership with STX Films, the remake of the Blake Edwards’ film "10" with Warner Brothers.

In 2022, Hyde Park and Warner Music Entertainment launched the Hyde Park Entertainment and Warner Music Entertainment Asian Women Fellowship, in partnership with Film Independent, which will showcase women-identifying writers and writer-directors who are Asian or part of the Asian Diaspora. The Fellowship is aligned with Hyde Park and Warner Music Group's shared, ongoing commitment to diversity and inclusion.

The recently announced Hyde Park Asia slate includes the Pulitzer Prize runner-up Maximum City to be directed by Anurag Kashyap and the best-selling novel Paradise Towers with filmmaker Zoya Akhtar.

Amritraj serves on the Producer's A2025 committee to advance inclusion & equitable opportunities at the Academy of Motion Pictures & Arts, and on the advisory board for the Dodge Film School at Chapman University. In 2015, he was bestowed an honorary Doctorate of the Arts from the University of East London.

Filmography 
He was a producer in all films unless otherwise noted.

Film 

As an actor

As writer

Miscellaneous crew

Thanks

Television 

As an actor

References

External links 
 
 
 

1956 births
Living people
American people of Indian descent
Indian emigrants to the United States
Film producers from Chennai
Indian male tennis players
Amritraj family
American independent film production company founders